Assayad (Arabic: Hunter) was a weekly news magazine published in Lebanon between 1943 and 2018. It was the first pan-Arab magazine in the country. Its headquarters was in Beirut.

History and profile
Assayad was launched by Dar Assayad publishing house led by Said Freiha on 22 November 1943. Freiha was an advocate of Gamal Abdel Nasser, Egyptian president. The publishing house also owned other publications including daily Al Anwar.

The magazine was based in Beirut and had offices in various cities including Riyadh, Abu Dhabi, Dubai, Cairo, Damascus, Amman, London, and Paris. In Fall 2018 the Dar Assayad publishing house ended its operations and closed the magazine together with other publications.

Contributors
Many prominent journalists worked for the magazine: Mustafa Ameen, Nizar Kabbani, Selim El Laouzi, Amin Malouf, Melhem Karam, Said Akl, Nabil Khoury, Hisham Abu Zahr, and Talal Salman. Lebanese caricaturist Pierre Sadek also work in the magazine.

From 1967 to 1972, its editor-in-chief was Palestinian journalist and writer Ghassan Kanafani. As of 2012, the editorial team of the magazine included Raouf Chahour, Rafik Khoury, George Trad and Lima Nabil.

Content and circulation
Assayad carried articles about politics, economy, social affairs in the Arab and international context. In addition, it covered arts, entertainment, and life style topics. The magazine also published interviews, one of which was with Leila Ben Ali, former first lady of Tunisia.

In 2009 Assayad sold 76,192 copies.

See also
List of magazines in Lebanon

References

1943 establishments in Lebanon
2018 disestablishments in Lebanon
Arabic-language magazines
Defunct magazines published in Lebanon
Defunct political magazines
Magazines established in 1943
Magazines disestablished in 2018
Magazines published in Beirut
News magazines published in Asia
Pan-Arabist media
Weekly magazines published in Lebanon
Weekly news magazines